Muratpaşa Belediyespor is a multi-sports club established 1995 in Antalya, Turkey by the municipality of Muratpaşa district.

Muratpaşa Belediyespor's main activities are in basketball,  gymnastics, handball, athletics, wrestling and football branches. The women's handball team plays in the Turkish Women's Handball Super League and became champion in the 2011–12, 2012–13 and 2013–14 season consecutively. The football side became champion in the 2011–12 season of Super Amateur League.

References

External links
 Official website